The Speaker of the Parliament of Tuvalu is the presiding officer of the Parliament of Tuvalu. 

The annual salary of the speaker is AU$ 22,395.

List of speakers

References

Politics of Tuvalu
Tuvalu
 
1975 establishments in Tuvalu